The Desert's Price is a 1925 American silent Western film directed by W. S. Van Dyke and written by Charles Darnton. It is based on the 1924 novel The Desert's Price by William MacLeod Raine. The film stars Buck Jones, Florence Gilbert, Edna Marion, Ernest Butterworth, Arthur Housman and Montagu Love. The film was released on December 13, 1925, by Fox Film Corporation.

Plot
As described in a review in a film magazine, while Wils McCann is away, Julia Starke's father is shot and many of their sheep killed. Knowing of the land war between shepherds and ranchers, she blames the McCann outfit. Not knowing that Wils is McCann, Julia accepts his help when an unruly ram chases her. Wils, learning of her suspicions, discovers that a shady bunch, the Martin Brothers, are the real culprits. The Martin Brothers attempt to win the Starke sisters but are refused. Sam Martin attempts to kiss Nora and she falls and is badly hurt. Julia goes after Sam and shoots at him, and her brother Phil later has a fight with Sam who is shot. On a tip from Jim Martin, the sheriff comes to arrest Julia and makes Wils his deputy. He offers her a chance to escape but she insists on giving herself up. Sam incites the mob to attack the sheriff's home. Wils inveigles him there while Julia rides for Wils' men, who arrive in time to disperse the mob. Sam's henchman accuses him of killing Julia's father and her sheep. Sam tries to make a getaway but Wils goes after him and subdues him. Phil is freed by the jury and Julia acknowledges her love for Wils.

Cast

References

External links
 
 

1925 films
1925 Western (genre) films
Fox Film films
Films directed by W. S. Van Dyke
American black-and-white films
Silent American Western (genre) films
1920s English-language films
1920s American films